The Alaska Anchorage Seawolves men's ice hockey statistical leaders are individual statistical leaders of the Alaska Anchorage Seawolves men's ice hockey program in various categories, including goals, assists, points, and saves. Within those areas, the lists identify single-game, single-season, and career leaders. The Seawolves represent the University of Alaska Anchorage as in independent in the NCAA.

Alaska Anchorage began competing in intercollegiate ice hockey in 1979.  Alaska Anchorage last played hockey in the 2019–20 season. Alaska Anchorage intended to play in 2020–21, but canceled its season due to COVID-19 issues, and dropped the sport due to financial fallout from the pandemic. A subsequent fundraising drive was successful enough to lead UAA to reinstate hockey, with play resuming for the 2022–23 season.  These lists are updated through the end of the 2019–20 season.

Goals

Assists

Points

Saves

References

Lists of college ice hockey statistical leaders by team
Statistical